Wolfgang von Schweinitz (born 7 February 1953 in Hamburg) is a German composer of classical music and an academic teacher.

Career 
Schweinitz studied composition at the Hochschule für Musik und Theater Hamburg, from 1971 to 1973 with Gernot Klussmann and from 1973 to 1975 with György Ligeti. He continued his studies at the Stanford University with John Chowning. He was a Stipendiat of the Villa Massimo in 1978, at the same time as Sarah Kirsch. In 1980 he taught at the Darmstädter Ferienkurse. His opera Patmos, based on the Apocalypse of St John, was premiered in 1990 at the second Munich Biennale.

From 1994 to 1996, Schweinitz was a professor of composition at the Hochschule für Musik "Franz Liszt", Weimar. In 2007 he succeeded composer James Tenney at the California Institute of the Arts.

Music 
Since 1997, Schweinitz has been concerned with "[r]esearching and establishing new microtonal tuning and ensemble playing techniques based on non-tempered just intonation" in his compositions. Schweinitz's music is often characterized by its freely expressive counterpoint exploring the distinctive melodic and harmonic networks of just intonation within a rigorously structured formal logic.

Between 2000 and 2004, Schweinitz together with Canadian composer Marc Sabat developed a staff notation for just intonation called the Extended Helmholtz-Ellis JI Pitch Notation.

Awards
1986 Schneider-Schott Music Prize
1992 Hindemith Prize of the Schleswig-Holstein Musik Festival

Recordings
 Variationen über ein Thema von Mozart, Harmonia Mundi Deutschland
 Mass for soloists, choir and orchestra op. 21, WERGO

References

External links 
 Wolfgang von Schweinitz, at CalArts
 
 List of works, at Plainsound Music Edition

German opera composers
Male opera composers
20th-century classical composers
21st-century classical composers
1953 births
Musicians from Hamburg
Living people
German male classical composers
20th-century German composers
21st-century German composers
20th-century German male musicians
21st-century German male musicians